Blastocladia bonaerensis is a species of aquatic fungus from Argentina.

References

External links
 Mycobank entry

Fungi described in 2006
Blastocladiomycota